Lisdeivis Víctores Pompa (born July 2, 1974 in Havana) is a women's basketball player from Cuba. Playing as a center she won the gold medal with the Cuba women's national basketball team at the 2003 Pan American Games in Santo Domingo, Dominican Republic.

Víctores also competed for her native country at two consecutive Summer Olympics, starting in 1996 (Atlanta, Georgia), finishing in sixth and ninth place in the final rankings.

References
FIBA Profile
 

1974 births
Living people
Cuban women's basketball players
Basketball players at the 1996 Summer Olympics
Basketball players at the 2000 Summer Olympics
Olympic basketball players of Cuba
Basketball players from Havana
Basketball players at the 2003 Pan American Games
Pan American Games gold medalists for Cuba
Pan American Games medalists in basketball
Centers (basketball)
Medalists at the 2003 Pan American Games